The 1920 United States Senate election in Illinois took place on November 2, 1920.

Incumbent Republican senator Lawrence Yates Sherman opted to retire rather than seeking reelection. Fellow Republican William B. McKinley was elected to succeed him in office.

Election information
The primaries and general election coincided with those for House and those for state elections, but not those for president. Primaries were held September 15, 1920.

The 1920 United States Senate elections were the first to be held since the Nineteenth Amendment to the United States Constitution granted national women's suffrage. This was the first Illinois U.S. Senate election in which women could vote.

Background
In 1916, incumbent Lawrence Yates Sherman made the decision to retire from politics and to not seek reelection in 1920, due to his failing hearing, which prevented him from hearing what was said on the Senate floor.

Democratic primary

Candidates
Robert Emmet Burke
Peter A. Waller, Kewanee glove manufacturer

Campaign
Burke, known as "O.K. Bobby" by supporters, stood on a platform opposed to the League of Nations and ratification of the Treaty of Versailles. He was also opposed to Prohibition and critical of President Wilson. Waller had the support of the Democratic establishment. Neither ran an active campaign.

Results

Republican primary

Candidates
Burnett M. Chiperfield, former U.S. Representative at-large (from Canton)
William B. McKinley, U.S. Representative from Champaign
Frank L. Smith, U.S. Representative from Dwight

Results

Socialist primary

Candidates
Gustave T. Fraenckel

Results

General election

Candidates
George Dodd Carrington Jr. (Single Tax)
John Fitzpatrick, trade union leader
Gustave T. Fraenckel (Socialist)
William B. McKinley (Democratic), U.S. congressman
Joseph B. Moody (Socialist Labor)
Peter A. Waller (Republican)
Frank B. Vennum (Prohibition Party), activist, capitalist, philanthropist, 1912 candidate for Illinois treasurer, 1918 U.S. Senate candidate

Results

See also
1920 United States Senate elections

References

1920
Illinois
United States Senate